Feathering may refer to:

 Feathering, a technique used in computer graphics to blur edges.
 Feathering, vertical justification in typesetting.
 Feathering (reentry) (also feathered reentry, or shuttlecock reentry), an atmospheric reentry technique for spacecraft
Feathering (propeller), changing an aircraft or wind turbine propeller blade by angling the blades parallel to airflow
Feathering (clutch), alternately engaging and disengaging an automotive clutch
Tarring and feathering, a type of punishment of medieval and early modern times
Feathering (horse), long hair on the lower legs of some breeds of horse
Fletching an arrow or similar missile

See also
Feather (disambiguation)